Qorqori District is a district (bakhsh) in Hirmand County, Sistan and Baluchestan province, Iran. At the 2006 census, its population was 15,172, in 3,074 families.  The district has no cities. The district has one rural district (dehestan): Qorqori Rural District.

References 

Hirmand County
Districts of Sistan and Baluchestan Province